"Everything Is Good for You" is a 1996 song by Australian rock group Crowded House. It was the first single released from the group's greatest hits compilation, Recurring Dream. It peaked at number ten on the Australian ARIA Singles Chart.

Track listing
 "Everything Is Good for You"
 "History Never Repeats" (Live in Auckland 24 March 1995) – Pearl Jam With The Finn Brothers.
 "Chocolate Cake" (Live in Newcastle, Australia 20 March 1992 (not 1996 as stated on sleeve) – begins with a live rendition of "Rocky Raccoon" by The Beatles
 "Into Temptation" (Live in Sheffield, U.K. 21 June 1992)

Charts

References

Crowded House songs
1996 singles
1996 songs
Capitol Records singles
Song recordings produced by Mitchell Froom
Song recordings produced by Tchad Blake
Songs written by Neil Finn